Ali Diarra (born 10 January 1988) is an Ivorian footballer who plays as a midfielder.

Career
Diarra began his career in 2004 at ASEC. In January 2010, he signed for Thai club Phuket F.C. In January 2011, he joined Muangthong United F.C. on a five-year deal. He went to Suphanburi F.C. on loan in 2012, and helped the club gain promotion to the Premier League. He returned to Muangthong United after his loan expired in December. In 2013, Diarra was loaned to Singhtarua F.C.

References

1988 births
Living people
Ivorian footballers
Footballers from Abidjan
Association football midfielders
ASEC Mimosas players
Issia Wazy players
Ali Diarra
Ali Diarra
Ali Diarra
Ali Diarra
Ali Diarra
Ali Diarra
Ali Diarra
Ali Diarra
Ali Diarra
Ali Diarra
Ivorian expatriate footballers
Expatriate footballers in Thailand
Ivorian expatriate sportspeople in Thailand